The 2018/19 FIS Ski Jumping Continental Cup is the 28th in a row (26th official) Continental Cup winter season in ski jumping for men and the 15th for ladies. This is also the 17th summer continental cup season for men and 11th for ladies.

Other competitive circuits this season include the World Cup, Grand Prix, FIS Cup, FIS Race and Alpen Cup.

Map of continental cup hosts 

All 21 locations hosting continental cup events in summer (8 for men / 1 for ladies) and in winter (14 for men / 4 for ladies) this season.

 Men
 Ladies
 Men & Ladies

Men

Summer

Winter

Ladies

Summer

Winter

Men's standings

Summer

Winter

Beskidy Tour

Ladies' standings

Summer

Winter

Europa Cup vs. Continental Cup 
Last two seasons of Europa Cup in 1991/92 and 1992/93 are recognized as first two Continental Cup seasons by International Ski Federation, although Continental Cup under this name officially started first season in 1993/94 season.

References 

FIS Ski Jumping Continental Cup
2018 in ski jumping
2019 in ski jumping